Yulisa Amadu Pat Maddy (27 December 1936 – 16 March 2014) was a Sierra Leonean writer, poet, actor, dancer, director and playwright. Known by his friends and colleagues as Pat Maddy or simply Prof, he had an "immense impact" on theatre in Sierra Leone, Nigeria and Zambia.

Biography
Maddy was born in Freetown, Sierra Leone to Creole parents, where he grew up and was educated (attending St. Edward's Secondary School) until the age of 22. In 1958 he travelled to France and then Britain.
Maddy trained at the Rose Bruford College of Speech and Drama in the UK, and started broadcasting in Britain and Denmark, writing and producing radio plays.

He was Director of Drama at the Keskidee Centre in London, and led the short-lived Pan African Players, which in 1966 represented the United Kingdom, together with the Negro Theatre Workshop, at the first World Festival of Negro Arts in Dakar, Senegal, performing Obi Egbuna's Wind versus Polygamy. Maddy's early plays, initially produced on the BBC African Service, were published as Obasai and Other Plays (1968). In the mid-1960s he lived in Denmark, where a book of his poetry, Ny afrikansk prosa, was published (1969).

On his return to Sierra Leone in 1968 Maddy became Head of Drama on Radio Sierra Leone. He was a founder-director of the theatre company Gbakanda Afrikan Tiata, founded 1969 in Freetown. He subsequently worked in Zambia, where he directed the national dance troupe and trained them for the Montreal World's Fair in 1970. He also taught drama in Nigeria, at the University of Ibadan and the University of Ilorin, and in the United States.

His first novel, No Past, No Present, No Future, explored the dynamics of a group of three friends (including, controversially, at the time, one gay man) growing up in colonial West Africa and their physical, psychological and emotional journeys to Europe. It was published in 1973, to great acclaim in the Heinemann African Writers Series, and his writing continued to develop. His work, which is often challenging and confrontational, has been broadcast by the BBC and published internationally. However, the uncompromising honesty of his writing, particularly in his views on the social and political inequalities in Africa, led to his political imprisonment in Sierra Leone. Upon his release, he was forced to leave the country and become a political exile.

In 2007, Maddy returned to Sierra Leone to teach at Freetown's Milton Margai College of Education and continue his academic research of exploring and developing Sierra Leone's cultural heritage, providing inspiration and opportunities to a new generation of artists and performers, and continuing to give a "voice to the voiceless" through the work of his Gbakanda Foundation. After a long period of illness, he died in March 2014, aged 78, at Choitram Hospital, Freetown.

Awards and honours
Maddy received a Sierra Leone National Arts Festival Award in 1973, a Gulbenkian Grant from the Calouste Gulbenkian Foundation in 1978, and in 1979 an Edinburgh Festival Award.

He has also received the distinction of being commemorated in a special stained-glass window of the Pride Library in Canada, as one of 135 writers, including William Shakespeare, Federico García Lorca, W. H. Auden, James Baldwin and others, who have been acknowledged for their outstanding contribution to literature.

Works
 Alla Gbah [The Big Man], 1967
 Yon Kon [Clever Thief], 1968. Reprinted in Cosmo Pieterse (ed.), Ten One-Act Plays, Heinemann, 1968. African Writers Series 34.
 Obasai [Over Yonder], 1971. Reprinted in Obasai and Other Plays, Heinemann, 1968. African Writers Series 89.
 Ghana Bendu [Tough Guy], 1971
 Life Everlasting, 1972. Reprinted in Cosmo Pieterse (ed.), Short African Plays, Heinemann, 1972. African Writers Series 78.
 No Past, No Present, No Future (novel), London: Heinemann Educational, 1973. African Writers Series 137. 
 If Wishes Were Horses (radio play), 1973
 Big Breeze Blow, produced Freetown, 1974
 Take Tem Draw Di Rope, Freetown, 1975
 Naw We Yone Dehn See, 1975
 Put for Me, produced Freetown, 1975
 Big Berrin (Big Burying), Freetown, 1976
 Saturday Night Out (television play), 1980
 A Journey Into Christmas, 1980
 Drums, Voices and Words, 1985
 (with Donnarae MacCann) African Images in Juvenile Literature: Commentaries on Neocolonialist Fiction, Jefferson, N.C.: McFarland, 1996
 (with Donnarae MacCann) Neo-imperialism in Children's Literature about Africa: A Study of Contemporary Fiction, New York: Routledge, 2009.

References

External links
"Yulisa Amadu Maddy interview, Freetown, Sierra Leone, July 2, 1975"
 George Ola-Davies, "Sierra Leone News: Alagbah: Fare thee Well", Awoko, 8 April 2014.
 "Sierra Leone News: Tribute: To Pat Maddy", Awoko, 9 April 2014.

1936 births
2014 deaths
Sierra Leone Creole people
Sierra Leonean dramatists and playwrights
Sierra Leonean novelists
Literary critics
Sierra Leonean writers
Sierra Leonean male poets
20th-century Sierra Leonean poets
20th-century novelists
20th-century dramatists and playwrights
People from Freetown
20th-century male writers
20th-century Sierra Leonean writers
21st-century Sierra Leonean writers